Li Qun (born 10 November 1973 in Harbin, Heilongjiang) is a Chinese basketball coach and former international player who competed for China men's national basketball team in the 2000 Summer Olympics. He became head coach of the Shenzhen Leopards (2015/10/31 - 2016/3/05).

References 

1973 births
Living people
Basketball players from Heilongjiang
Chinese men's basketball players
Olympic basketball players of China
Basketball players at the 2000 Summer Olympics
Guangdong Southern Tigers players
Chinese basketball coaches